Monilea belcheri, common name Belcher's top shell, is a species of sea snail, a marine gastropod mollusk in the family Trochidae, the top snails.

Description

The size of the shell varies between 12 mm and 17 mm. The umbilicate, thin shell has a depressed-conoidal shape. It is sharply transversely lirate with narrow, elevated, sharp lirae, of which three are stronger, alternating with two or three smaller ones; about 12 similar ones are on the base; all of them are crossed and made subgranose by closely crowded growth lines. Its surface is white, painted with scattered red dots and a few larger red spots. The apex is white or rose-red. The strongly convex whorls are separated by a subcanaliculate suture, the last rounded. The umbilicus is moderate in size and surrounded by a peculiarly reddish-brown colored callus. The aperture is subrhomboidal. The columella  is nearly perpendicular and incised at its base.

Distribution
This marine species occurs on sandy beaches and in the subtidal zone off Thailand and in the Western Pacific (Fiji, Tonga, New Caledonia) and off Japan and Queensland, Australia.

References

 Hedley, C. 1923. Studies on Australian Mollusca. Part XIV. Proceedings of the Linnean Society of New South Wales 48: 301-316, pls 30-33 
 Ladd, H.S. 1966. Chitons and gastropods (Haliotidae through Adeorbidae) from the western Pacific Islands. United States Geological Survey Professional Papers 531: 1-98 16 pls
 Tantanasiriwong, R. 1978. An illustrated checklist of marine shelled gastropods from Phuket Island, adjacent mainland and offshore islands, Western Peninsula, Thailand. Phuket Marine Biological Center, Research Bulletin 21: 1-22, 259
 Wilson, B. 1993. Australian Marine Shells. Prosobranch Gastropods. Kallaroo, Western Australia : Odyssey Publishing Vol. 1 408 pp.

External links
 To Biodiversity Heritage Library (3 publications)
 To Encyclopedia of Life
 To USNM Invertebrate Zoology Mollusca Collection
 To World Register of Marine Species
 

belcheri
Gastropods described in 1849